Lorenzo Mata-Real (born  February 27, 1986) is an American professional basketball player in Mexico's Liga Nacional de Baloncesto Profesional (LNBP). He was the center for the UCLA Bruins men's basketball team from 2004–05 until 2007–08, and was an important part of their final four runs in 2006, 2007, and 2008. Born in the United States, Mata has also played for the Mexico national team.

High school
Mata averaged 25.0 points and 15.0 rebounds in his senior season. He led the South Gate Rams to an 18–8 overall record, an unbeaten Eastern League mark and one playoff victory. In the L.A. City Sectional quarterfinal game, future UCLA teammate Josh Shipp's Fairfax High School team defeated South Gate 89–85. In his junior year he led South Gate to their first playoff victory in 11 years.

UCLA career
Mata was recruited by Ben Howland along with Jordan Farmar, Josh Shipp, and Arron Afflalo to attend UCLA. These four led UCLA to the Final Four in back to back seasons (2005–2006, 2006–2007).  His stats improved each year at UCLA, scoring 6.7 points and pulling down 5.5 rebounds while shooting 67% from the floor during his junior year. In his senior season he added his mother's last name (Real) to his jersey.

Professional career
After going undrafted in the 2008 NBA draft, Mata tried out for a team in the Japanese pro league. He then signed onto the Los Angeles Lakers summer league team in order to make a name for himself among NBA scouts.
Mata played in the LNBP for the Halcones de Xalapa and for the Mexico National Team, and for Piratas de Quebradillas, with whom he won the 2013 BSN Championship.

In 2013, Mata helped lead Mexico to victory in the gold medal game against Puerto Rico at the FIBA Americas Championship.

Pan American Games
Pan American Games 2011  Silver Medal

FIBA AmeriCup
FIBA Americas Championship 2013 Gold Medal

Centrobasket
Centrobasket 2016  Silver Medal

References

External links
 RealGM profile

1986 births
Living people
American men's basketball players
American sportspeople of Mexican descent
Basketball players from California
Centers (basketball)
Halcones de Xalapa players
Libertadores de Querétaro players
Mexican men's basketball players 
People from Huntington Park, California
People from South Gate, California
Pioneros de Quintana Roo players
Piratas de Quebradillas players
Soles de Mexicali players
Sportspeople from Los Angeles County, California
Toros de Nuevo Laredo players
UCLA Bruins men's basketball players